The Marvel superhero character of Spider-Man has appeared in multiple forms of media besides the comics, including on television numerous times, in both live action and animated television programs.

Live-action

Spidey Super Stories (1974–1977) 

The character was first portrayed in live action by Danny Seagren in Spidey Super Stories, an Electric Company segment which ran from 1974 to 1977.

The Amazing Spider-Man (1977)

In 1977, a short-lived live action television series was produced called The Amazing Spider-Man, starring Nicholas Hammond in the title role. Although the series earned good ratings, the CBS Television Network canceled it after just two seasons, along with Wonder Woman, to avoid being labeled as "the superhero network." The series was broadcast only sporadically during the second season. Several episodes from this series were turned into full-length motion pictures outside the U.S. Three movies were released overseas: Spider-Man in 1977, Spider-Man Strikes Back in 1978, and Spider-Man: The Dragon's Challenge in 1981.

Spider-Man (1978)

In 1978, a Spider-Man live-action tokusatsu series was produced for Japanese television by Toei Company. Due to a request by Bandai that the show include giant robots and vehicles, it was not a faithful adaptation. It was not related to Ryoichi Ikegami's earlier 1970 Spider-Man manga. Toei planned to follow the series with a new show starring a Japanese counterpart of Captain America called "Captain Japan", which was revamped into Battle Fever J, the first official installment of Toei's Super Sentai franchise (barring the retroactive recognition of Himitsu Sentai Gorenger and JAKQ Dengekitai in later years). The concept of costumed superheroes piloting giant robots introduced in the Japanese Spider-Man was carried over to Battle Fever J, which became a tradition in the Super Sentai franchise.

Animation

Spider-Man (1967)

The first animated series was simply titled Spider-Man, and ran on ABC from 1967 to 1970. The show's first season was produced by Grantray-Lawrence Animation, which soon went bankrupt. In 1968, animator Ralph Bakshi took over. Bakshi's episodes, which suffered from extremely low budgets, were stylized and featured dark ominous settings and pervasive background music. One episode reused complete background animation, characters, and storyline from an episode of Rocket Robin Hood. The series may be best remembered for its theme song. In recent years several internet memes gained prominence that use the simplistic art style and awkward situation of this series for comedic purposes. Spider-Man was voiced by Paul Soles.

Spider-Man (1981)

In 1981, with the creation of the animation studio Marvel Productions Ltd., Marvel endeavored to translate more of their comic characters to television. To garner the attention of the major networks, Marvel first created a new syndicated Spider-Man cartoon that was partially based on the old 1960s show. The strategy worked, and NBC became interested in having their own Spider-Man cartoon. Spider-Man was voiced by Ted Schwartz.

Spider-Man and His Amazing Friends (1981)

Towards this end the cartoon series Spider-Man and His Amazing Friends was created for NBC featuring Spider-Man, Iceman of the X-Men, and a new character, Firestar. Actor Dan Gilvezan gave voice to this incarnation of the wall-crawler. This series also featured a number of Marvel guest stars, and shared many of its character designs with the solo Spider-Man show produced just before it.

Spider-Man (1994)

The 1994 Spider-Man animated series was made for the Fox Network, with Christopher Daniel Barnes providing the voice of Spider-Man. This series had a bigger budget and used a novel system of one large story arc per season, developed by John Semper. As a result, each of the individual 65 episodes (starting with season 2) were called "chapters". This was the longest Spider-Man series, with 65 episodes in five seasons, until 2012's Ultimate Spider-Man surpassed it.

Spider-Man Unlimited (1999)

In 1999, an animated series named Spider-Man Unlimited was developed for Fox in which Spider-Man is transported to an animated Counter-Earth inspired by the one created by the High Evolutionary in early 1970s comics. This series was cancelled after one season. Spider-Man was voiced by Rino Romano.

Spider-Man: The New Animated Series (2003)

In 2003, another television series adaptation, Spider-Man: The New Animated Series this time using computer animation was produced by Mainframe Entertainment for Sony Pictures Television and broadcast on MTV; it featured characters and continuity from the 2002 Spider-Man film, as well as Michael Clarke Duncan voicing the Kingpin, reprising his role from the 2003 live action Daredevil film adaptation. The show lasted only one season, which contained 13 episodes. Spider-Man was voiced by Neil Patrick Harris.

The Spectacular Spider-Man (2008)

This television series is heavily inspired by both the early Lee/Ditko and Romita The Amazing Spider-Man stories and the Bendis/Bagley Ultimate Spider-Man. Peter Parker is still a teenager living in contemporary New York, as in Bendis' Ultimate version, but many of the cast members borrow from both the early and later years of Spider-Man comics. Many of the original supporting cast, including Flash Thompson, have been translated into modern terms but are still very true to the comics, and some have altered ethnicities: Liz Allan is Hispanic and Ned Lee (formerly "Leeds") is Korean. The first season follows several plot arcs drawn from the comics. Two seasons of the series were aired, each containing 13 episodes. The series ended when Sony Pictures relinquished its rights, which it had licensed from Marvel, to produce animated works using Spider-Man and associated characters. Spider-Man was voiced by Josh Keaton.

Ultimate Spider-Man (2012)

Ultimate Spider-Man aired on Disney XD. It started airing on April 1, 2012. Spider-Man/Peter Parker is voiced by Drake Bell. The show's third season is subtitled "Web-Warriors", and the fourth season is subtitled "vs. The Sinister Six".

The series ended in a two part series finale on January 7, 2017, bringing the episode count to 104 and making it the longest running Marvel animated series ever at that time. Avengers Assemble animated series passed this benchmark in 2019 and has aired 126 episodes.

Spider-Man (2017)

Spider-Man features Spider-Man (voiced by Robbie Daymond) teaming up with Miles Morales as Spider-Man II, Gwen Stacy as Spider-Gwen/Ghost Spider, and Anya Corazon as Spider-Girl.

Spidey and His Amazing Friends (2021)

A new children's television series titled Spidey and His Amazing Friends premiered on August 6, 2021 on Disney Junior. Peter Parker / Spidey is voiced by Benjamin Valic.

Spider-Man: Freshman Year and Sophomore Year 

Spider-Man: Freshman Year explores Peter Parker's origin story and early days using the Spider-Man persona. It is produced by Marvel Studios for Disney+, part of the Marvel Cinematic Universe (MCU) franchise, and takes place in an alternate timeline from the MCU in which Norman Osborn meets and mentors Parker in place of Tony Stark in the films Captain America: Civil War (2016) and Spider-Man: Homecoming (2017). The series will feature a style that "celebrates" and pays homage to the early The Amazing Spider-Man comic books.

Announced in November 2021, Jeff Trammel serves as head writer and executive producer for the series, with the cast  featuring Charlie Cox as Matt Murdock / Daredevil (reprising his role from previous MCU media) and Paul F. Tompkins as Bentley Wittman. The series will debut on the streaming service Disney+ in 2024, with a second season, subtitled Sophomore Year, in development.

Appearances in other series
 Spider-Man guest starred on the Spider-Woman TV series in the episodes "Pyramids of Terror" and "The Kongo Spider". He was voiced by Paul Soles.
 In an episode of the Marvel Productions-produced animated series Muppet Babies, "Comic Capers", Spider-Man appears in a fantasy sequence the characters create that is inspired by The Amazing Spider-Man newspaper comic strip.
 Spider-Man appears shooting a web to save a citizen in the X-Men episode "Phoenix Saga (Part 5): Child of Light".
 Peter Parker appears in the episode, "Frightful", of the animated series Fantastic Four: World's Greatest Heroes, voiced by Sam Vincent. In the episode, he is hired as a freelance photographer by Johnny Storm, to take publicity stills of the Fantastic Four in order to maintain their reputation as heroes, following the emergence of their counterparts, the Frightful Four.
 Spider-Man appears in The Avengers: Earth's Mightiest Heroes in the season 2 episode "Along Came a Spider...", voice reprised by Drake Bell. Originally, it was Josh Keaton to reprise his role from The Spectacular Spider-Man and had even recorded his dialogue with the rest of the voice cast, but he was then redubbed by Bell. Tasked as Peter Parker to take pictures for an interview with Captain America, whom he admires, he works with him to save civilians from the Serpent Society. Spider-Man reappears in the episode "New Avengers", as a member of the New Avengers, along with Luke Cage, War Machine, Wolverine, Iron Fist and the Thing, and assumes the leadership of the team. Later, he joins the Avengers as a reserve member. Spider-Man returns in the season-two finale in a battle against Galactus.
 Spider-Man is a major character on the Marvel Disk Wars: The Avengers series, voiced by Shinji Kawada in Japanese and Robbie Daymond in English.
 Spider-Man is a recurring character in the Marvel Future Avengers series, with Shinji Kawada and Robbie Daymond reprising their roles in Japanese and English dubbed versions from Marvel Disk Wars: The Avengers and the Spider-Man TV series and various Marvel media respectively.
 Hudson Thames voices Peter Parker / Spider-Man in the Marvel Cinematic Universe television series What If...?. Tom Holland, who portrays the character in the live-action films, could not reprise his role due to contractual conflicts regarding Sony Pictures.

Marvel Animated Universe

 Spider-Man appears in five episodes of Avengers Assemble, with Drake Bell reprising his role (excluding the episode "Vibranium Curtain" Pt. 2, where Robbie Daymond reprises the role). In "Hulk's Day Out", he is selling hot dogs. In "Avengers Disassembled", Spider-Man temporarily joins the Avengers as Captain America's replacement, but leaves the team near the end of the episode due to Captain America and Iron Man being unable to work together. In "Avengers Underground", Spider-Man is among the heroes the Squadron Supreme imprison, although in his case, he is actually occupied with one of their drones. In "Avengers World", Spider-Man appears at the end of the episode on a holographic globe as one of the heroes Iron Man and Captain America consider potential Avengers. Finally in "Vibranium Curtain" Pt. 2, Spider-Man shows up and works with Black Panther to fight Vulture.
 Spider-Man appears in Hulk and the Agents of S.M.A.S.H. episode "The Collector", voiced again by Drake Bell. He teams-up with the Hulk to defeat the Collector. Spider-Man also appears in "the Venom Within", "Spidey, I Blew Up the Dinosaur", "Days of Future Smash: The Dino Era Part 1" (as Spider-Raptor) and "Planet Monster Part 2".
 Spider-Man appears in the Guardians of the Galaxy episode "Back in the New York Groove", voiced by Robbie Daymond, as by this point, the series in which Daymond voices Parker had already premiered.

Television specials
 Spider-Man appeared alongside Thor, Iron Man and the Hulk in the summer 2013 animated special Phineas and Ferb: Mission Marvel. with Drake Bell reprising his role from the 2012 Ultimate Spider-Man series.
 Spider-Man appears in the Lego Marvel Super Heroes: Maximum Overload special, voiced by Drake Bell.
 Spider-Man appears in the Lego Marvel Super Heroes: Avengers Reassembled special, voiced again by Benjamin Diskin.

Mentions within Marvel animated series
 In Iron Man animated series, when a hacker causes H.O.M.E.R., the Starks' artificial intelligence, to malfunction, he mentions Peter Parker.
 A small reference is made to Spider-Man in the X-Men: Evolution episode "On Angel's Wings", when the Angel is seen reading the Daily Bugle, the place Spider-Man/Peter Parker usually works.
 Spider-Man is referenced several times in the animated series The Super Hero Squad Show. In the episode "Election of Evil", the Mayor of Superhero City (who is played by Stan Lee, one of the character's creators) references Spider-Man by saying that he tried to get superpowers by "getting bitten by a radioactive bug", and his campaign motto is "With great responsibility comes great power... and vice-versa". This is due to Sony still owned Spider-Man at that time which means he cannot appear on the show but only within video game adaptations as well as book adaptations.
 In the animated series Fantastic Four: World's Greatest Heroes, Johnny Storm hires a freelance photographer to help make him look good to the public. While it is not explicitly stated, the photographer is confirmed to be Peter Parker who was voiced by Sam Vincent.
 In Iron Man: Armored Adventures Spider-Man is alluded to. In “Iron Man 2099” a Maggia goon mistakes Hawkeye for Spider-Man after Hawkeye uses a web arrow to catch one of his cohorts.

Mentions within Marvel Cinematic Universe series
 In a flashback during season 1 of Daredevil to Matt and Foggy's time at Landman & Zack, Foggy mentions having "bumped into Morales", referring to Rio Morales, the mother of Miles Morales. In the 12th episode of Daredevil season 1, when Ben Urich is taking a drink from his glass and right before he realizes Wilson Fisk is there, a photograph of Spider-Man is visible in the newspaper posted on his pin-board to the far right of the center-top. In the 12th episode of Daredevil season 3, when Karen Page is visiting a boxing gym, an old poster behind her advertises a fight between a "Parker" and a "Morales".
 In the 12th episode of Jessica Jones season 1, Spider-Man-themed ice pops are shown to be on sale when Jessica is tailing a Kilgrave-controlled courier through Central Park.
 At the end of the fourth episode of Iron Fist season 1, Ward Meachum compares Danny Rand's scaling of a building to "goddamned Daredevil" in the original release. In the Italian and German dubs of the show, Ward compares Danny to "goddamned Spider-Man".
 In the final episode of The Defenders, when Danny Rand unleashes his Iron Fist upon Madame Gao, the action is immediately accompanied by the Wu Tang Clan's song "Protect Ya Neck". The section of the song heard in the fight scene speaks of "Swingin' through your town like your neighborhood Spider-Man".

References

External links
 SPIDER-MAN ANIMATED SERIES RANKED WORST TO BEST, on The Nerdist.

 
Spider-Man in other media